Francis Baker may refer to:
Francis Asbury Baker (1820–1865), deacon
Francis E. Baker (1860–1924), Indiana Supreme Court justice and U.S. federal judge
Francis Matthew John Baker (1903–1939), member of the Australian House of Representatives
Francis Patrick Baker (1873–1959), member of the Australian House of Representatives
Francis Raymond Baker (born 1961), British ambassador 
Francis Baker (cricketer) (1847–1901), English cricketer
Francis Eustace Baker, governor of Saint Helena, Ascension and Tristan da Cunha

See also

Frank Baker (disambiguation)
Frances Baker, British painter